William Hallett Greene or  Green ( October 1864May 1942) was the first black member of the U.S. Signal Corps, the first black graduate of City College of New York, and first black meteorologist.

Family and education
Greene was born in New York City as the son of Susan Bulkley and Hallett Green, recorded in the census as a mulatto coachman who owned his residence on W. 31st Street. William graduated from City College (now part of the City University of New York) at the age of 19 with a Bachelor of Science degree in 1884. The New York Times reported on his class' graduation, noting that "W.H. Greene is the first colored boy who has ever graduated from the college, and he has made a good record. The audience applauded him liberally last night." His portrait now hangs in the Trustee Lounge of the City University of New York.

Enlistment in the Signal Corps
Greene applied to the U.S. Signal Corps but was initially rejected, as they did not accept any black members at that time. His case was taken up by the then-president of City College, General Alexander Webb, who wrote to Secretary of War Robert Todd Lincoln on behalf of Greene. Lincoln agreed that Greene deserved a place in the Signal Corps but faced strong opposition from Brigadier General William Hazen, Commanding Officer of the Signal Corps. Hazen's opposition rested on the convention (approved by Congress) that black soldiers could only serve in four regiments, two in the cavalry and two in the infantry. After Lincoln overruled Hazen's interpretation of this convention, Greene was accepted into the U.S. Signal Corps as its first African-American member. He had received a high score on the Corps' competitive entrance exam.

Greene served under conditions of duress in Pensacola, Florida, before being transferred to Rochester, New York. In 1887, only a few years after he enlisted, Greene was unfairly yet dishonorably discharged from the Corps after a series of disputed claims regarding his behavior and character. He later changed his name and moved to New Orleans, Louisiana to start a new life with a new identity to escape the pain and dishonor brought to him at the hands of the military during Jim Crow.

Legacy
His enlistment in the Signal Corps in September 1884 opened the door for other African-Americans to enlist in some branches of the Army from which they were previously barred, including the Hospital Corps, Ordnance Corps, Commissary, and Quartermaster Departments.

Greene is considered to be the first black meteorologist and first black station chief in the Signal Corps.

In 2007, the New York State Assembly's Standing Committee on Veterans’ Affairs paid tribute to Greene's triumphs and challenges with a resolution, "Honoring the Life and Accomplishment of William Hallett Greene, the First Black Graduate of the City University of New York, and Member of the United States Army Signal Corps."

See also 
 Military history of African Americans
 Henry Ossian Flipper
 List of African-American firsts

References

1864 births
Date of birth unknown

1942 deaths 
Year of death uncertain
19th-century American military personnel
African-American United States Army personnel
City College of New York alumni
20th-century African-American people